Ophyx prereducta is a moth of the family Erebidae. It is found on the Solomon Islands.

References

Ophyx
Moths described in 1984
Moths of the Solomon islands